Four Acres may refer to:

 Four Acres, a former ground of West Bromwich Albion F.C.
 Four Acres, California, an unincorporated community in Placer County, California
 Four Acres (Charlottesville, Virginia), a historic home located at Charlottesville, Virginia